O'Brother is an American rock band from Atlanta, Georgia. After releasing their debut EP, In Comparison to Me, in 2006, Aaron Wamack and Tanner Merritt joined the band in 2008. A second EP, The Death of Day was released on May 5, 2009 by Favorite Gentlemen Recordings, to positive reviews. The band also released a vinyl split of their song, Lay Down, in collaboration with Sainthood Reps (a side-project of Brand New's Derrick Sherman), under the vinyl label, The Ambitious Guest. After the release of The Death of Day, the band toured with Manchester Orchestra and The Features in February – March 2010. O'Brother joined Thrice's Major/Minor tour in September – November 2011, alongside Moving Mountains and La Dispute. Their first LP, Garden Window, was released on November 15, 2011, and was well-received critically. The record was released by Triple Crown  and was co-produced by  Andy Hull and Robert McDowell from Manchester Orchestra. The band recorded a session at Daytrotter in Nov 2011. In February 2012, O'Brother went on a co-headlining tour with Junius. Aaron Wamack left the band prior to the tour's start.

Band members
Current members
 Tanner Merritt - lead vocals, guitar
 Johnny Dang – guitar
 Jordan McGhin - guitar
 Michael Martens – drums
 Anton Dang - bass

Discography

EPs
 In Comparison to Me (2006)
 The Death of Day (2009)
 Basement Window (2012)

Studio albums
 Garden Window (2011)
 Disillusion (2013)
 Endless Light (2016)
 You and I (2020)

References

External links 

 O'Brother's Official Website
 O'Brother's Official Facebook page

American post-hardcore musical groups
Experimental musical groups
Musical quintets
Musical groups established in 2006
Musical groups from Georgia (U.S. state)
Triple Crown Records artists